Dylan Armstrong (born January 15, 1981) is a Canadian shot putter. He is a two-time Pan American Games champion, a former Commonwealth Games champion and has also won world championship silver and bronze medals. He was awarded the bronze medal at the 2008 Summer Olympics seven years after the event in 2015, following a doping disqualification by competitor Andrei Mikhnevich. Armstrong holds the Canadian national record and the Pan American Games record for shot put, and is a former holder of the Commonwealth games record. With his world championship medal, Armstrong was the first Canadian to reach the podium in a throwing event in a major global competition.

Career
Prior to focusing on the shot put in 2004, Armstrong competed in the hammer throw. As a junior, he won a gold medal at the 1999 Pan American Junior Games and a silver medal at the 2000 World Junior Championships. He continues to hold the North American high school and junior records in the hammer throw. His personal best is 71.51 meters, achieved in April 2003 in Walnut.

Armstrong achieved a personal best, and Canadian record at that time, of 21.04 meters at the 2008 Summer Olympics in Beijing, where he finished fourth, missing out on a medal by a single centimetre. However, on August 20, 2014 the Canadian Olympic Committee announced that Armstrong would be awarded the 2008 Summer Olympic bronze medal by the International Olympic Committee. This followed a retroactive lifetime ban for doping violations dating back to 2005 given to Belarusian shot putter Andrei Mikhnevich, who had won the medal initially.

Commonwealth and World Championships success
28 years after former Canadian national champion Bruno Pauletto won gold at the 1982 Commonwealth Games Armstrong succeeded in reiterating that performance at the 2010 edition of the Games, placing first with a Commonwealth record of 21.02 m. At the 2010 World Indoor Championship, in Doha, Qatar, Dylan placed fourth with a Canadian indoor record of 21.39 m. He improved his outdoor national record to 21.58 m at the Askina Meeting in Baunatal, Germany, beating Ralf Bartels to the victory. When in 2014 Andrei Mikhnevich was stripped of the event's silver medal for doping violations, Armstrong moved up to the bronze medal position.

His first true world success came at the 2011 World Championships in Athletics when he won the silver at the outdoor event for shot put. He threw a 21.64 before David Storl of Germany beat him with a 21.78 on his last throw. Armstrong next attended the 2011 Pan American Games, there he went on to win gold and broke the Pan American Games record with a 21.30. Armstrong finished off the year by winning the Diamond League title in shot put.

As one of Canada's leading medal favorites and only medal favorite in athletics, Armstrong had set a season's best of 21.50 heading into the 2012 Summer Olympics in London. There he finished 5th, falling short of a medal.

Olympic bronze medal awarded
Prior to the beginning of the 2013 World Athletics Championships, Armstrong was awarded the bronze medal from the 2010 IAAF World Indoor Championships after Andrei Mikhnevich's positive drug test and subsequent forfeiture of his silver medal. At the time the IAAF and IOC had yet to rule on whether Armstrong would as well receive the bronze medal from the 2008 Olympics where he just missed the podium behind Mikhnevich. In an interview regarding the possible return of the medal Armstrong stated that "I worked hard for it, and I want it back...It's my country's medal too, we deserve it." The decision to allocate the Olympic bronze medal to Armstrong was finally announced in January 2015.

After the awarding of his indoor medal, Armstrong began competition at the 2013 World Championships. He qualified for the finals where he threw 21.04
 m. In the finals he tossed a season's best 21.34 m. Armstrong acknowledge the importance of sport funding as a result of what was Canada's fourth medal at the World Championships, tying a record from the 1995 World Championships. He said that "I just feel amazing. My coach and I worked really hard, I made some really good choices this year. It's another medal for Canada, it shows that when you have the right coaches in place, the right support and the funding behind it that it's going to pay off. You have to invest in sport, results don't come for free." Armstrong received his medal at a ceremony in his hometown of Kamloops on February 15, 2015, around 700 people attended the event.

Following his competitive career, Armstrong started coaching amateur athletes at the Kamloops Track and Field Club in 2017.

Personal life
Armstrong lives in Kamloops, British Columbia and trains there at the nearby National Throws Centre with coach Anatoliy Bondarchuk. In September 2015 Armstrong married the Russian shot putter Yevgeniya Kolodko whom he dated since 2012.

Achievements

See also
 Canadian records in track and field
List of Canadian sports personalities

References

External links

 
 Profile at Athletics Canada

1981 births
Living people
Athletes (track and field) at the 2008 Summer Olympics
Athletes (track and field) at the 2012 Summer Olympics
Athletes (track and field) at the 2007 Pan American Games
Athletes (track and field) at the 2010 Commonwealth Games
Athletes (track and field) at the 2011 Pan American Games
Canadian people of Scottish descent
Canadian male shot putters
Canadian male hammer throwers
Commonwealth Games gold medallists for Canada
Olympic track and field athletes of Canada
Sportspeople from Kamloops
World Athletics Championships medalists
Pan American Games gold medalists for Canada
Medalists at the 2008 Summer Olympics
Olympic bronze medalists for Canada
Commonwealth Games medallists in athletics
Pan American Games medalists in athletics (track and field)
Diamond League winners
Medalists at the 2007 Pan American Games
Medalists at the 2011 Pan American Games
21st-century Canadian people
Medallists at the 2010 Commonwealth Games